Angels in the Dust is a 2007 South African documentary film  by filmmaker Louise Hogarth. The film follows Marion Cloete, a university-trained therapist who leaves behind her life of privilege in  Johannesburg to build Boikarabelo, a village and school that provides orphaned children with shelter, food and education. The stories of the orphaned children are paralleled with the orphaned elephants of Pilanesberg National Park in South Africa.

Angels in the Dust won the 2007 Emerging Pictures/Full Frame Audience Award at the Full Frame Documentary Film Festival. It also won an Audience Award at the Encounters South African International Documentary Festival in 2008. It is produced by Dream Out Loud Films and Participant Productions.

Notes

External links

 
 
 13 Minute Preview Clip on YouTube
  imdb

Documentary films about orphanages
Documentary films about HIV/AIDS
Films shot in South Africa
Participant (company) films